West Virginia Colored Children's Home, also known as the West Virginia Colored Orphans Home, the West Virginia Home for Aged and Infirm Colored Men and Women, and University Heights Apartments, was a historic school, orphanage, and sanatorium building located near Huntington, Cabell County, West Virginia. It was the state's first social institution exclusively serving the needs of African American residents. The main structure, built in 1922–1923, was a three-story red brick building in the Classical Revival style. That building, located at 3353 U.S. Route 60, Huntington, West Virginia, was the last of a series of buildings that were constructed on the site. It was listed on the National Register of Historic Places in 1997. 

The original institution was founded in 1899 by the Rev. Charles McGhee as the West Virginia Normal and Industrial School for Colored Children in Bluefield, West Virginia. McGhee moved the institution to Huntington, West Virginia in 1903. In 1911, the private institution, which functioned as an orphanage and school, came under state control and support. It was then renamed the West Virginia Colored Orphans Home. In 1931, the institution's name was changed to the West Virginia Colored Children's Home. By 1951, residents of the Children's Home were no longer educated on site, but were bused to segregated public schools.

The West Virginia Colored Children's Home was closed in 1956 and the building was used as a rest home.  The property transferred to Marshall University in 1961 and later it was converted to apartments. The building was demolished on May 5, 2011. The location is now an empty field.

Howard H. Railey served as its superintendent. He was the first African American to serve in West Virginia’s legislature.

References

Hospital buildings completed in 1923
Residential buildings completed in 1923
School buildings completed in 1923
Buildings and structures in Huntington, West Virginia
Residential buildings on the National Register of Historic Places in West Virginia
Neoclassical architecture in West Virginia
Defunct schools in West Virginia
Demolished buildings and structures in West Virginia
Former school buildings in the United States
Historically segregated African-American schools in West Virginia
Hospital buildings on the National Register of Historic Places in West Virginia
Marshall University
National Register of Historic Places in Cabell County, West Virginia
School buildings on the National Register of Historic Places in West Virginia
1923 establishments in West Virginia